John McHugh (born 6 July 1943) is a Scottish former footballer.

McHugh began his senior career with Clyde in 1961. He went on to become a stalwart of the team, making 450 competitive appearances for the Glasgow club in 14 years, scoring 19 goals.

McHugh left Clyde in 1975, and joined Forfar Athletic, where he stayed for two years, making 77 appearances, scoring 1 goal. He retired in 1977, having clocked up 527 senior career appearances and 20 goals.

While at Clyde, McHugh was called up to the Scotland national team at least three times, but was never capped. He was called into the squad for friendlies against Netherlands, Portugal and Brazil in 1966. He did represent Glasgow against Leeds United in the Glasgow Charity Cup Final at Hampden in 1966.

References 

Living people
Scottish Football League players
Scottish footballers
Clyde F.C. players
Forfar Athletic F.C. players
1943 births
Association football midfielders